Katharina Thanderz (born 29 July 1988) is a Norwegian professional boxer. She held the WBC interim female super-featherweight title from 2019 until vacating in November 2020 to challenge for the full WBC title.

Professional career
Thanderz began her professional sporting career as a kickboxer, a sport she began at the age of ten. After 18 years in the sport, she made her professional boxing debut on 27 May 2016, scoring a four-round unanimous decision (UD) victory over Angela Cannizzaro at the Polideportivo Jose Caballero in Alcobendas, Spain. In her first fight in her natal Norway, she defeated Maria Semertzoglou for the vacant European super-featherweight title on 21 October 2017. She claimed a majority decision (MD) victory over undefeated Rachel Ball on 2 March 2019 after overcoming a broken hand suffered in the fourth round. This moved her to 11–0 in her pro career. She competed at the 2019 European Games in Belarus in June.

Professional boxing record

Personal life
She was born to a Norwegian mother and a Spanish father in Oslo, where she spent the first seven years of her life. She moved with her family to Altea, Spain, where she still lives and trains.

References

External links

Living people
1988 births
Norwegian women boxers
Super-featherweight boxers
Lightweight boxers
Norwegian people of Spanish descent
Spanish people of Norwegian descent
Sportspeople from Oslo
People from Marina Baixa
Sportspeople from the Province of Alicante
European Boxing Union champions
Boxers at the 2019 European Games